The gravitational force equivalent, or, more commonly, g-force, is a measurement of the type of force per unit mass – typically acceleration – that causes a perception of weight, with a g-force of 1 g (not gram in mass measurement) equal to the conventional value of gravitational acceleration on Earth, g, of about . Since g-forces indirectly produce weight, any g-force can be described as a "weight per unit mass" (see the synonym specific weight). When the g-force is produced by the surface of one object being pushed by the surface of another object, the reaction force to this push produces an equal and opposite weight for every unit of each object's mass. The types of forces involved are transmitted through objects by interior mechanical stresses. Gravitational acceleration (except certain electromagnetic force influences) is the cause of an object's acceleration in relation to free fall.

The g-force experienced by an object is due to the vector sum of all non-gravitational forces acting on an object's freedom to move. In practice, as noted, these are surface-contact forces between objects. Such forces cause stresses and strains on objects, since they must be transmitted from an object surface. Because of these strains, large g-forces may be destructive.

Gravity acting alone does not produce a g-force, even though g-forces are expressed in multiples of the free-fall acceleration of standard gravity. Thus, the standard gravitational force at the Earth's surface produces g-force only indirectly, as a result of resistance to it by mechanical forces. It is these mechanical forces that actually produce the g-force on a mass. For example, a force of 1 g on an object sitting on the Earth's surface is caused by the mechanical force exerted in the upward direction by the ground, keeping the object from going into free fall. The upward contact force from the ground ensures that an object at rest on the Earth's surface is accelerating relative to the free-fall condition. (Free fall is the path that the object would follow when falling freely toward the Earth's center). Stress inside the object is ensured from the fact that the ground contact forces are transmitted only from the point of contact with the ground.

Objects allowed to free-fall in an inertial trajectory under the influence of gravitation only feel no g-force, a condition known as weightlessness. This is also termed "zero-g", although the more correct term is "zero g-force". This is demonstrated by the zero g-force conditions inside an elevator falling freely toward the Earth's center (in vacuum), or (to good approximation) conditions inside a spacecraft in Earth orbit. These are examples of coordinate acceleration (a change in velocity) without a sensation of weight.

In the absence of gravitational fields, or in directions at right angles to them, proper and coordinate accelerations are the same, and any coordinate acceleration must be produced by a corresponding g-force acceleration. An example here  is a rocket in free space, in which simple changes in velocity are produced by the engines and produce g-forces on the rocket and passengers.

Unit and measurement

The unit of measure of acceleration in the International System of Units (SI) is m/s2. However, to distinguish acceleration relative to free fall from simple acceleration (rate of change of velocity), the unit g (or g) is often used.  One g is the force per unit mass due to gravity at the Earth's surface and is the standard gravity (symbol: gn), defined as  metres per second squared, or equivalently  newtons of force per kilogram of mass. The unit definition does not vary with location—the g-force when standing on the Moon is almost exactly  that on Earth.
The unit g is not one of the SI units, which uses "g" for gram.  Also, "g" should not be confused with "G", which is the standard symbol for the gravitational constant. This notation is commonly used in aviation, especially in aerobatic or combat military aviation, to describe the increased forces that must be overcome by pilots in order to remain conscious and not g-LOC (g-induced loss of consciousness).

Measurement of g-force is typically achieved using an accelerometer (see discussion below in Measurement using an accelerometer). In certain cases, g-forces may be measured using suitably calibrated scales. Specific force is another name that has been used for g-force.

Acceleration and forces

The term g-"force" is technically incorrect as it is a measure of acceleration, not force. While acceleration is a vector quantity, g-force accelerations ("g-forces" for short) are often expressed as a scalar, with positive g-forces pointing downward (indicating upward acceleration), and negative g-forces pointing upward. Thus, a g-force is a vector of acceleration. It is an acceleration that must be produced by a mechanical force, and cannot be produced by simple gravitation. Objects acted upon only by gravitation experience (or "feel") no g-force, and are weightless.
g-forces, when multiplied by a mass upon which they act, are associated with a certain type of mechanical force in the correct sense of the term "force", and this force produces compressive stress and tensile stress. Such forces result in the operational sensation of weight, but the equation carries a sign change due to the definition of positive weight in the direction downward, so the direction of weight-force is opposite to the direction of g-force acceleration:

Weight = mass × −g-force

The reason for the minus sign is that the actual force (i.e., measured weight) on an object produced by a g-force is in the opposite direction to the sign of the g-force, since in physics, weight is not the force that produces the acceleration, but rather the equal-and-opposite reaction force to it. If the direction upward is taken as positive (the normal cartesian convention) then positive g-force (an acceleration vector that points upward) produces a force/weight on any mass, that acts downward (an example is positive-g acceleration of a rocket launch, producing downward weight). In the same way, a negative-g force is an acceleration vector downward (the negative direction on the y axis), and this acceleration downward produces a weight-force in a direction upward (thus pulling a pilot upward out of the seat, and forcing blood toward the head of a normally oriented pilot).

If a g-force (acceleration) is vertically upward and is applied by the ground (which is accelerating through space-time) or applied by the floor of an elevator to a standing person, most of the body experiences compressive stress which at any height, if multiplied by the area, is the related mechanical force, which is the product of the g-force and the supported mass (the mass above the level of support, including arms hanging down from above that level). At the same time, the arms themselves experience a tensile stress, which at any height, if multiplied by the area, is again the related mechanical force, which is the product of the g-force and the mass hanging below the point of mechanical support. The mechanical resistive force spreads from points of contact with the floor or supporting structure, and gradually decreases toward zero at the unsupported ends (the top in the case of support from below, such as a seat or the floor, the bottom for a hanging part of the body or object). With compressive force counted as negative tensile force, the rate of change of the tensile force in the direction of the g-force, per unit mass (the change between parts of the object such that the slice of the object between them has unit mass), is equal to the g-force plus the non-gravitational external forces on the slice, if any (counted positive in the direction opposite to the g-force).

For a given g-force the stresses are the same, regardless of whether this g-force is caused by mechanical resistance to gravity, or by a coordinate-acceleration (change in velocity) caused by a mechanical force, or by a combination of these. Hence, for people all mechanical forces feels exactly the same whether they cause coordinate acceleration or not. For objects likewise, the question of whether they can withstand the mechanical g-force without damage is the same for any type of g-force. For example, upward acceleration (e.g., increase of speed when going up or decrease of speed when going down) on Earth feels the same as being stationary on a celestial body with a higher surface gravity. Gravitation acting alone does not produce any g-force; g-force is only produced from mechanical pushes and pulls. For a free body (one that is free to move in space) such g-forces only arise as the "inertial" path that is the natural effect of gravitation, or the natural effect of the inertia of mass, is modified. Such modification may only arise from influences other than gravitation.

Examples of important situations involving g-forces include:
 The g-force acting on a stationary object resting on the Earth's surface is 1 g (upwards) and results from the resisting reaction of the Earth's surface bearing upwards equal to an acceleration of 1 g, and is equal and opposite to gravity. The number 1 is approximate, depending on location.
 The g-force acting on an object in any weightless environment such as free-fall in a vacuum is 0 g.
 The g-force acting on an object under acceleration can be much greater than 1 g, for example, the dragster pictured at top right can exert a horizontal g-force of 5.3 when accelerating.
 The g-force acting on an object under acceleration may be downwards, for example when cresting a sharp hill on a roller coaster.
 If there are no other external forces than gravity, the g-force in a rocket is the thrust per unit mass. Its magnitude is equal to the thrust-to-weight ratio times g, and to the consumption of delta-v per unit time.
 In the case of a shock, e.g., a collision, the g-force can be very large during a short time.

A classic example of negative g-force is in a fully inverted roller coaster which is accelerating (changing velocity) toward the ground. In this case, the roller coaster riders are accelerated toward the ground faster than gravity would accelerate them, and are thus pinned upside down in their seats. In this case, the mechanical force exerted by the seat causes the g-force by altering the path of the passenger downward in a way that differs from gravitational acceleration. The difference in downward motion, now faster than gravity would provide, is caused by the push of the seat, and it results in a g-force toward the ground.

All "coordinate accelerations" (or lack of them), are described by Newton's laws of motion as follows:

The Second Law of Motion, the law of acceleration states that: , meaning that a force F acting on a body is equal to the mass m of the body times its acceleration a.

The Third Law of Motion, the law of reciprocal actions states that: all forces occur in pairs, and these two forces are equal in magnitude and opposite in direction. Newton's third law of motion means that not only does gravity behave as a force acting downwards on, say, a rock held in your hand but also that the rock exerts a force on the Earth, equal in magnitude and opposite in direction.

In an airplane, the pilot's seat can be thought of as the hand holding the rock, the pilot as the rock. When flying straight and level at 1 g, the pilot is acted upon by the force of gravity. This mechanical force provides the 1.0 g-force upward proper acceleration on the pilot, even though this velocity in the upward direction does not change (this is similar to the situation of a person standing on the ground, where the ground provides this force and this g-force).

If the pilot were suddenly to pull back on the stick and make his plane accelerate upwards at 9.8 m/s2, the total g‑force on his body is 2 g, half of which comes from the seat pushing the pilot to resist gravity, and half from the seat pushing the pilot to cause his upward acceleration—a change in velocity which also is a proper acceleration because it also differs from a free fall trajectory.

Unopposed acceleration due to mechanical forces, and consequentially g-force, is experienced whenever anyone rides in a vehicle because it always causes a proper acceleration, and (in the absence of gravity) also always a coordinate acceleration (where velocity changes). Whenever the vehicle changes either direction or speed, the occupants feel lateral (side to side) or longitudinal (forward and backwards) forces produced by the mechanical push of their seats.

The expression  means that for every second that elapses, velocity changes  metres per second (≡). The automobile traveling at three times this speed, can brake to a standstill in three seconds.

In the case of an increase in speed from 0 to v with constant acceleration within a distance of s this acceleration is v2/(2s).

Preparing an object for g-tolerance (not getting damaged when subjected to a high g-force) is called g-hardening. This may apply to, e.g., instruments in a projectile shot by a gun.

Human tolerance

Human tolerances depend on the magnitude of the gravitational force, the length of time it is applied, the direction it acts, the location of application, and the posture of the body.

The human body is flexible and deformable, particularly the softer tissues. A hard slap on the face may briefly impose hundreds of g locally but not produce any real damage; a constant  for a minute, however, may be deadly. When vibration is experienced, relatively low peak g levels can be severely damaging if they are at the resonant frequency of organs or connective tissues.

To some degree, g-tolerance can be trainable, and there is also considerable variation in innate ability between individuals. In addition, some illnesses, particularly cardiovascular problems, reduce g-tolerance.

Vertical
Aircraft pilots (in particular) sustain g-forces along the axis aligned with the spine. This causes significant variation in blood pressure along the length of the subject's body, which limits the maximum g-forces that can be tolerated.

Positive, or "upward" g, drives blood downward to the feet of a seated or standing person (more naturally, the feet and body may be seen as being driven by the upward force of the floor and seat, upward around the blood). Resistance to positive g varies.

In aircraft particularly, vertical g-forces are often positive (force blood towards the feet and away from the head); this causes problems with the eyes and brain in particular. As positive vertical g-force is progressively increased (such as in a centrifuge) the following symptoms may be experienced:
 Grey-out, where the vision loses hue, easily reversible on levelling out
 Tunnel vision, where peripheral vision is progressively lost
 Blackout, a loss of vision while consciousness is maintained, caused by a lack of blood flow to the head
 G-LOC, a g-force induced loss of consciousness
 Death, if g-forces are not quickly reduced

Resistance to "negative" or "downward" g, which drives blood to the head, is much lower. This limit is typically in the  range. This condition is sometimes referred to as red out where vision is figuratively reddened due to the blood-laden lower eyelid being pulled into the field of vision. Negative g is generally unpleasant and can cause damage. Blood vessels in the eyes or brain may swell or burst under the increased blood pressure, resulting in degraded sight or even blindness.

Horizontal
The human body is better at surviving g-forces that are perpendicular to the spine. In general when the acceleration is forwards (subject essentially lying on their back, colloquially known as "eyeballs in"), a much higher tolerance is shown than when the acceleration is backwards (lying on their front, "eyeballs out") since blood vessels in the retina appear more sensitive in the latter direction.

Early experiments showed that untrained humans were able to tolerate a range of accelerations depending on the time of exposure. These forces were endured with cognitive facilities intact, as subjects were able to perform simple physical and communication tasks. The tests were determined to not cause long- or short-term harm although tolerance was quite subjective, with only the most motivated non-pilots capable of completing tests. The record for peak experimental horizontal g-force tolerance is held by acceleration pioneer John Stapp, in a series of rocket sled deceleration experiments culminating in a late 1954 test in which he was clocked in a little over a second from a land speed of Mach 0.9. Stapp lived another 45 years to age 89 without any ill effects.

The highest recorded g-force experienced by a human who survived was during the 2003 IndyCar Series finale at Texas Motor Speedway on October 12, 2003 in the 2003 Chevy 500 when the car driven by Kenny Bräck made wheel-to-wheel contact with Tomas Scheckter's car.

Short duration shock, impact, and jerk
Impact and mechanical shock are usually used to describe a high-kinetic-energy, short-term excitation. A shock pulse is often measured by its peak acceleration in ·s and the pulse duration. Vibration is a periodic oscillation which can also be measured in ·s as well as frequency. The dynamics of these phenomena are what distinguish them from the g-forces caused by a relatively longer-term accelerations.

After a free fall from a height  followed by deceleration over a distance  during an impact, the shock on an object is · . For example, a stiff and compact object dropped from 1 m that impacts over a distance of 1 mm is subjected to a 1000  deceleration.

Jerk is the rate of change of acceleration. In SI units, jerk is expressed as m/s3; it can also be expressed in standard gravity per second (/s; 1 /s ≈ 9.81 m/s3).

Other biological responses
Recent research carried out on extremophiles in Japan involved a variety of bacteria (including E. coli as a non-extremophile control) being subject to conditions of extreme gravity. The bacteria were cultivated while being rotated in an ultracentrifuge at high speeds corresponding to 403,627 g. Paracoccus denitrificans was one of the bacteria that displayed not only survival but also robust cellular growth under these conditions of hyperacceleration, which are usually only to be found in cosmic environments, such as on very massive stars or in the shock waves of supernovas. Analysis showed that the small size of prokaryotic cells is essential for successful growth under hypergravity. Notably, two multicellular species, the nematodes Panagrolaimus superbus and Caenorhabditis elegans were shown to be able to tolerate 400,000 × g for 1 hour.
The research has implications on the feasibility of panspermia.

Typical examples

Measurement using an accelerometer

An accelerometer, in its simplest form, is a damped mass on the end of a spring, with some way of measuring how far the mass has moved on the spring in a particular direction, called an 'axis'.

Accelerometers are often calibrated to measure g-force along one or more axes. If a stationary, single-axis accelerometer is oriented so that its measuring axis is horizontal, its output will be 0 g, and it will continue to be 0 g if mounted in an automobile traveling at a constant velocity on a level road. When the driver presses on the brake or gas pedal, the accelerometer will register positive or negative acceleration.

If the accelerometer is rotated by 90° so that it is vertical, it will read +1 g upwards even though stationary. In that situation, the accelerometer is subject to two forces: the gravitational force and the ground reaction force of the surface it is resting on. Only the latter force can be measured by the accelerometer, due to mechanical interaction between the accelerometer and the ground. The reading is the acceleration the instrument would have if it were exclusively subject to that force.

A three-axis accelerometer will output zero‑g on all three axes if it is dropped or otherwise put into a ballistic trajectory (also known as an inertial trajectory), so that it experiences "free fall," as do astronauts in orbit (astronauts experience small tidal accelerations called microgravity, which are neglected for the sake of discussion here). Some amusement park rides can provide several seconds at near-zero g. Riding NASA's "Vomit Comet" provides near-zero g for about 25 seconds at a time.

See also
 Artificial gravity
 Earth's gravity
 Euthanasia Coaster
 Gravitational acceleration
 Gravitational interaction
 Hypergravity
 Load factor (aeronautics)
 Peak ground acceleration – g-force of earthquakes
 Relation between g-force and apparent weight
 Shock and vibration data logger
 Shock detector

Notes and references

Further reading

External links
 "How Many Gs Can a Flyer Take?", October 1944, Popular Science—one of the first detailed public articles explaining this subject
 Enduring a human centrifuge at the NASA Ames Research Center at Wired

Acceleration
Gravimetry
Units of acceleration